Pseudonocardia bannensis is a bacterium from the genus of Pseudonocardia which has been isolated from roots of the plant Artemisia annua in Yunnan in China.

References

Pseudonocardia
Bacteria described in 2012